The men's 100 metres at the 2010 African Championships in Athletics were held on July 28–29.

Medalists

Results

Heats
Qualification: First 3 of each heat (Q) and the next 3 fastest (q) qualified for the semifinals.

Semifinals
Qualification: First 2 of each semifinal (Q) and the next 2 fastest (q) qualified for the final.

Final
Wind: +1.90 m/s

External links
Results

100
100 metres at the African Championships in Athletics